6th Congress may refer to:
6th Congress of the Communist Party of Cuba (2011)
6th Congress of the Communist Party of Yugoslavia (1952)
6th Congress of the Party of Labour of Albania (1971)
6th Congress of the Philippines (1966–1969)
6th Congress of the Russian Social Democratic Labour Party (Bolsheviks) (1917)
6th Congress of the Workers' Party of Korea (1980)
6th National Congress of the Chinese Communist Party (1928)
6th National Congress of the Communist Party of Vietnam (1986)
6th National Congress of the Kuomintang (1945)
6th National Congress of the Kuomintang (Wang Jingwei) (1939)
6th National Congress of the Lao People's Revolutionary Party (1996)
6th National People's Congress (1983–1988)
6th United States Congress (1799–1801)
International Socialist Congress, Amsterdam 1904, the 6th Congress of the Second International